The Indian Independence Act 1947 (1947, Chapter 30, 10 and 11; Geo 6) is an Act of the Parliament of the United Kingdom that partitioned British India into the two new independent dominions of India and Pakistan. The Act received Royal Assent on 18 July 1947 and thus modern-day India and Pakistan, comprising west (modern day Pakistan) and east (modern day Bangladesh) regions, came into being on 15 August.

The legislature representatives of the Indian National Congress, the Muslim League, and the Sikh community came to an agreement with Lord Mountbatten on what has come to be known as the 3 June Plan or Mountbatten Plan. This plan was the last plan for independence.

Prelude

Attlee's announcement
Clement Attlee, the Prime Minister of the United Kingdom, announced on 20 February 1947 that:
The British Government would grant full self-government to British India by 30 June 1948 at the latest,
The future of the Princely States would be decided after the date of final transfer is decided.

3rd June Plan
The 3rd June 1947 Plan was also known as the Mountbatten Plan.
The British government proposed a plan, announced on 3 June 1947, that included these principles:
Principle of the partition of British India was accepted by the British Government
Successor governments would be given dominion status
Autonomy and sovereignty to both countries
Can make their own constitution
Princely States were given the right to join either Pakistan  India or stay Independent, based on two major factors: Geographical contiguity and the people's wishes.

Provisions

The Act's most important provisions were:
 Division of British India into the two new dominions – the Dominion of India and the Dominion of Pakistan – with effect from 15 August 1947;
 Partition of the provinces of Bengal and Punjab between the two new countries;
 Establishment of the office of Governor-General in each of the two new countries, as representatives of the Crown;
 Conferral of complete legislative authority upon the respective Constituent Assemblies of the two new countries;
 Termination of British suzerainty over the princely states, with effect from 15 August 1947. These states could decide to join either India or Pakistan;
 Abolition of the use of the title "Emperor of India" by the British monarch (this was subsequently executed by King George VI by royal proclamation on 22 June 1948);

The Act also made provision for the division of joint property, etc. between the two new countries, including in particular the division of the armed forces.

Salient features

Two new dominion states: Two new dominions were to emerge from the Indian empire: India and Pakistan.
Appointed Date: 15 August 1947 was declared as the appointed date for the partition.
Territories:
Pakistan: East Bengal, West Punjab, Sindh, and Chief Commissioner's Province of Baluchistan.
The fate of the North-West Frontier Province (now Khyber Pakhtunkhwa) was subject to the result of a referendum.
Bengal & Assam:
The province of Bengal as constituted under the Government of India Act 1935 ceased to exist.
In lieu thereof two new provinces were to be constituted, to be known respectively as East Bengal and West Bengal.
The fate of District Sylhet, in the province of Assam, was to be decided in a referendum.
Punjab:
The province as constituted under the Government of India Act 1935 ceased to exist.
Two new provinces were to be constituted, to be known respectively as West Punjab and East Punjab.
The boundaries of the new provinces were to be determined, whether before or after the appointed date, by the award of a boundary commission to be appointed by the Governor-General.
Constitution for the New Dominions: until the time of the making of the new constitution, the new dominions and the provinces thereof were to be governed by the Government of India Act 1935. (Temporary Provisions as to the Government of Each New Dominion).
The Governors-General of the new dominions:
For each of the new dominions a new Governor-General was to be appointed by the Crown, subject to the law of the legislature of either of the new dominions.
Same person as Governor-General of both dominions: if unless and until provision to the contrary was made by a law of the legislature of either of the new dominions, the same person could be the Governor-General of both.
Powers of Governor-General: (Section-9)
The Governor-General was empowered to bring this Act into force.
Division of territories, powers, duties, rights, assets, liabilities, etc., was the responsibility of Governor General.
To adopt, amend, Government of India Act 1935, as the Governor-General may consider it necessary.
power to introduce any change was until 31 March 1948, after that it was open to the constituent assembly to modify or adopt the same Act. (Temporary Provisions as to the Government of Each New Dominion.)
Governor-General had full powers to give assent to any law.
Legislation for the new dominions:
The existing legislative setup was allowed to continue as Constitution making body as well as a legislature. (Temporary Provisions as to the Government of Each New Dominion.)
The legislature of each dominion was given full powers to make laws for that dominion, including laws having extraterritorial operation.
No Act of Parliament of UK passed after the appointed date would be extended to the territories of new dominions.
No law and provision of any law made by the legislature of the new dominions shall be void or inoperative on the ground that it is repugnant to the law of England.
The Governor-General of each dominion had full powers to give assent in His Majesty's name to any law of the legislature. [Configuration of Pakistan's Constitution Assembly (CAP I): 69 members of the central legislature + 10 immigrant members= 79].
Consequences of setting up of the new dominions:
His Majesty's Government lost all the responsibility to the new dominions.
The suzerainty of His Majesty's Government over the Indian States lapsed.
All the treaties or agreements with the Indian States and the tribal areas that were in force at the passing of the act lapsed.
The title of "Emperor of India" was dropped from the titles of British Crown.
The office of Secretary of State for India was abolished and the provisions of GOI Act 1935 relating to the appointments to the civil service or civil posts under the crown by the secretary of the state ceased to operate.
Civil servants: Section 10 provided for the continuance of service of the government servants appointed on or before 15 August 1947 under the Governments of new Dominions with full benefits.
Armed Forces: Sections 11, 12, and 13 dealt with the future of the Indian armed forces. A Partition Committee was formed on 7 June 1947, with two representatives from each side and the viceroy in the chair, to decide about the division thereof. As soon as the process of partition was to start it was to be replaced by a Partition Council with a similar structure.
First and Second Schedules:
First Schedule listed the districts provisionally included in the new province of East Bengal:
Chittagong Division: Districts of Chittagong, Chittagong Hill Tracts, Noakhali and Tipperah.
Dacca Division: Districts of Bakarganj, Dacca, Faridpur, and Mymensingh.
Presidency Division: Districts of Jessore (except Bangaon Tehsil), and Kustia and Meherpur Tehsils (of Nadia district).
Rajshahi Division:Districts of Bogra, Dinajpur (except Raiganj and Balurghat Tehsil), Rajshahi, Rangpur and Nawabganj Tehsil (of Malda district).
Second Schedule listed the districts provisionally included in the new province of West Punjab:
Lahore Division: Districts of Gujranwala, Lahore (except Patti Tehsil), Sheikhupura, Sialkot and Shakargarh Tehsil (of Gurdaspur district).
Rawalpindi Division: Districts of Attock, Gujrat, Jehlum, Rawalpindi and Shahpur.
Multan Division: Districts of Dera Ghazi Khan, Jhang, Lyallpur, Montgomery, Multan and Muzaffargarh.

Partition

There was much violence, and many Muslims from what would become India fled to Pakistan; and Hindus and Sikhs from what would become Pakistan fled to India. Many people left behind all their possessions and property to avoid the violence and flee to their new country.

Princely states

On 25 July 1947, Mountbatten held a meeting with the Chamber of Princes, where he addressed the question of the princely states, of which there were about 565. The treaty relations between Britain and the Indian States would come to an end, and on 15 August 1947 the suzerainty of the British Crown was to lapse. Mountbatten ruled out any dominion status for any of the princely states, and advised them to acccede to one or the other of the dominions, India and Pakistan. Though it was technically possible for the states to remain free after 15 August, their dependence on the British government of India for defence and other matters rendered such freedom meaningless.

India

Lord Mountbatten continued as the first Governor General of independent India. Jawaharlal Nehru became the prime minister and Vallabhbhai Patel became the home minister.

Over 550 princely states, almost all of the states contiguous with the territory of India, acceded to India by 15 August. The exceptions were Junagadh, Hyderabad, and Jammu and Kashmir. The state of Jammu and Kashmir was contiguous to both India and Pakistan, but its Hindu ruler chose to remain independent "for the time being". Following a Pakistani tribal invasion, he acceded to India on 26 October 1947, and the state was disputed between India and Pakistan. The state of Junagadh initially acceded to Pakistan but faced a revolt from its Hindu population. Following a breakdown of law and order, its Dewan requested India to take over the administration on 8 November 1947. India conducted a referendum in the state on 20 February 1948, in which the people voted overwhelmingly to join India. The state of Hyderabad, with the majority Hindu population but Muslim ruler faced intense turmoil and sectarian violence. India intervened in the state on 13 September 1948, following which the ruler of the state signed the Instrument of Accession, joining India.

Pakistan

Muhammad Ali Jinnah became the Governor-General of Pakistan, and Liaquat Ali Khan became the Prime Minister of Pakistan.

Between October 1947 and March 1948 the rulers of several Muslim-majority states signed instruments of accession to join Pakistan. These included Amb, Bahawalpur, Chitral, Dir, Kalat, Khairpur, Kharan, Las Bela, Makran, and Swat.

Repeal

The Indian Independence Act was subsequently repealed in Article 395 of the Constitution of India and in Article 221 of the Constitution of Pakistan of 1956, both constitutions being intended to bring about greater independence for the new states. Although under British law, the new constitutions did not have the legal authority to repeal the Act, the repeal was intended to establish them as independent legal systems based only on home-grown legislation. The Act has not been repealed in the United Kingdom, where it still has an effect, although some sections of it have been repealed.

See also
Indian independence movement
Pakistan Movement
Partition of India
Political integration of India

Notes

References

External links

 Indian Independence Bill,1947

Image of the Act on the UK Parliamentary website

1947 in India
1947 in Pakistan
1947 in law
Independence acts in the Parliament of the United Kingdom
Partition of India
United Kingdom Acts of Parliament 1947
1947 in international relations
India–United Kingdom relations
Pakistan–United Kingdom relations
Acts of the Parliament of the United Kingdom concerning India
India and the Commonwealth of Nations
Pakistan and the Commonwealth of Nations
July 1947 events in Asia
July 1947 events in the United Kingdom
Constitution of Pakistan